Dr Douglas Mombeshora was Zimbabwe's Lands Minister from 2013 to 2018. He was appointed Minister of Lands following a landslide victory by ZANU–PF in the 2013 harmonized elections. He also served as Deputy Minister of Health and Child Welfare during the Inclusive Government of 2009–2013. He was the Member of House of Assembly for Mhangura (ZANU-PF).

Dr Mombeshora studied at Kutama College alongside fellow Cabinet Ministers, Dr Ignatius Chombo, Walter Chidhakwa and the late president Robert Mugabe.

References

Year of birth missing (living people)
Living people
Alumni of Kutama College
Members of the National Assembly of Zimbabwe
ZANU–PF politicians